Samuel L. Jones III (born April 29, 1983) is an American actor. He is best known for playing Pete Ross on the first three seasons of the Superman television series Smallville, Willie Worsley in the 2006 film Glory Road, Craig Shilo on Blue Mountain State, Chaz Pratt on ER and Billy Marsh in the 2006 film [[Home of the Brave (2006 film)|Home of the Brave]].

Career
In his early acting career, Jones played Pete Ross on the first three seasons of the television series Smallville, based on the early years of Superman, after which he left before season 3's final episode, but returned as Pete Ross in the season 7 episode "Hero". He left the series to film Glory Road. Jones has also appeared on the television shows The Practice, ER, CSI: Crime Scene Investigation, and 7th Heaven. He appeared with actress Raven-Symoné in the 2006 Lifetime movie For One Night.  Jones also played Craig Shilo in Spike TV's Blue Mountain State. Most recently, Jones joined the cast of writer/director Chris Blake's (a.k.a. Christopher Blake Johnson) indie horror film, All Light Will End, alongside Andy Buckley and John Schuck.

In 2014, Jones completed filming the movie Of Fortune and Gold. In 2016, Jones had a role in the film Blue Mountain State: The Rise of Thadland based on Spike TV's Blue Mountain State'' as the character Craig Shilo.

Personal life
In 2010, a sex tape leaked with his then model girlfriend Karissa Shannon. It was reported that the pair initially tried to block the release of the sex tape, for some time, but after striking a deal, the tape was released on DVD by Vivid Entertainment called: Karissa Shannon Superstar. In 2011, Jones and Shannon released a song entitled "Juice and Vodka"; once available on iTunes, currently available on TMZ a part of the Kam3 album.

Legal issues
Jones was convicted of conspiracy to possess illegal drugs with the intent to distribute. The incident was part of a DEA sting operation. On December 16, 2010, Jones pleaded guilty to conspiracy and on June 22, 2011, Jones was sentenced to 366 days in federal prison and three years' probation. On December 6, 2011, Jones began serving his sentence at the Lompoc Correctional Complex in California. He was released on October 12, 2012 after serving 10 months. He has since returned to acting.

Filmography

References
 http://www.lasplash.com/publish/Celebrity_Talk_102/actor-sam-jones-iii-interview.php

External links
 

African-American male actors
American male film actors
American male television actors
Living people
Male actors from Boston
American people convicted of drug offenses
American drug traffickers
1983 births
21st-century African-American people
20th-century African-American people